This is a list of monuments and other memorials to the Vietnam War.

Australia
Vietnam Forces National Memorial, Canberra
Beaudesert War Memorial
Cairns War Memorial
Esk War Memorial
Gair Park
Gympie Memorial Park
Sandgate War Memorial Park
Strathpine Honour Board
Tieri War Memorial
Toogoolawah War Memorial
Traveston Powder Magazine
Warwick War Memorial
Weeping Mother Memorial
World War I Cenotaph, Mackay
Yeppoon War Memorial
Yeronga Memorial Park
Long Tan Cross (original, in Canberra)
Torrens Parade Ground, Adelaide, South Australia
Vietnam War Comradeship Memorial, Cabravale Park, Cabramatta, New South Wales

Canada
The North Wall, Windsor, Ontario

Vietnam

 Vietnam War Memorial, Hanoi
Bến Dược Memorial Temple, Ho Chi Minh City
Đồng Lộc Junction
Embassy of the United States, Saigon
Long Tan Cross (replica on original site)
Trường Sơn Cemetery
Vịnh Mốc tunnels

United States
Augusta-CSRA Vietnam War Veterans Memorial, Augusta, Georgia 
 Charlestown Vietnam Veterans Memorial, Boston
 Inland Northwest Vietnam Veterans Memorial, Riverfront Park, Spokane
 Kentucky Vietnam Veterans Memorial, Frankfort, Kentucky
 National Japanese American Veterans Memorial Court, Los Angeles
 New Jersey Vietnam Veterans Memorial, Holmdel, New Jersey
 Vietnam Veterans Memorial, in Washington, D.C.
 Vietnam Women's Memorial, adjacent
 Vietnam Memorial of Los Angeles County, Grand Park, Los Angeles, CA.
 Vietnam Veterans Memorial (The Wall-USA), an online memorial
 Vietnam Veterans Memorial, Wesley Bolin Memorial Plaza, Phoenix, Arizona
 Vietnam Veterans Memorial Bridge, Baltimore
 Vietnam Veterans Memorial Bridge, Ohio River
 Vietnam Veterans Memorial Bridge, Richmond
 Vietnam Veterans Memorial State Park, Angel Fire, New Mexico
 Vietnam Veterans Memorial (Olympia, Washington)
 Vietnam War Memorial, in Houston Texas 
 Vietnam Veterans' Memorial Park, Museum of Flight, Seattle
 Vietnam Veterans of Oregon Memorial, Portland, Oregon
 The Vietnam Wall of Southwest Florida, in Punta Gorda, FL
 Vietnam War Memorial (Milwaukie, Oregon)
The Vietnam War Memorial, in Westminster, CA
 The Virtual Wall, an online memorial

See also
List of war museums and monuments in Vietnam
List of Korean War memorials
List of Confederate monuments and memorials
List of Union Civil War monuments and memorials

References

Memorials